Imperial Blaze is the fourth studio album by dancehall artist Sean Paul. The album was released on 18 August 2009.

Background
The album was originally scheduled to be released in the summer of 2007 under the name The Next Thing, but was then pushed to November 2008.

Sean Paul told MTV that he wanted to be less focused on party songs such as "Get Busy", "We Be Burnin'", and "Temperature". He said he wants his songs to focus on youth violence in Jamaica, however, the resulting album contained mainly up-tempo party songs. He subsequently released a mixtape which focused on youth violence in Jamaica.

The album's title means "Kings Fire". Sean Paul commented on the title saying,

In an interview with DJ Swerve, Sean Paul confirmed that he did 60 tracks for the album, with 19 tracks making the final cut.

On 10 July, a song from the album, "Press It Up", was premiered on Sean Paul's official website. A video was filmed for "Press It Up", which was directed by Jessy Terrero
  
The album was put on pre-order on 17 July 2009. Those who pre-ordered will receive two digital track downloads to songs titled "She Wanna Be Down" and "Get with It Girl". On the German iTunes Store Imperial Blaze was released on 14 August 2009.

Sean Paul expressed delight regarding the progress of the album on the international stage. "It's a good feeling and I'm happy – very happy that people like the music, and that they've been going out and getting the album," he said.

"Number 1 in Japan is a big achievement for me. I'm especially proud of that, because outside of Jamaica, Japanese people are really the biggest consumers of dancehall music," he said.

Imperial Blaze was certified gold in France, debuting at number 8 in that country, number 5 in Canada, number 4 in Switzerland, 15 in Belgium, 17 in Austria, and 17 in Germany.

It was also the first Jamaican album to debut atop the Billboard Rap charts. The wholly Jamaican produced project debuted atop the Billboard Reggae Charts, number 3 on the Hip Hop/R&B Albums chart and number 12 on the Billboard 200 with first-week sales of 28,500 copies in the US.

As of January 2012, the album has sold 101,000 copies in United States.

Singles
 The first official single is "So Fine", peaking at number 50 on the Billboard Hot 100.
 The second official single is "Press It Up". It was released on 4 August 2009. The music video was released on 9 September 2009.
 The third single is "Hold My Hand", which features Keri Hilson. It was sent to U.S. radio on 29 September 2009.

Reception

Initial critical response to Imperial Blaze was mixed. At Metacritic, which assigns a normalized rating out of 100 to reviews from mainstream critics, the album has received an average score of 44, based on seven reviews, indicating "mixed or average" reviews. Tim Sendra of Allmusic gave the album 3.5 stars out of 5, praising the sound of the album; "It may bode ill for the commercial prospects of the album, but it does mean that the people who do buy Imperial Blaze will be purchasing a record that is very good, and more importantly, a great deal of fun from beginning to end." Jay Soul of RapReviews, gave the album a negative review with a 3 out of 10 score by stating "I am a massive Sean Paul fan, and it's almost like watching a heavyweight champion past his prime being forced to fight, when all he wants to do is quit the game and be a coach." Christian Hoard of Rolling Stone gave the album 2 stars out of 5, describing the album as "pale versions of past hits". The album was nominated for Best Reggae Album at the 52nd Annual Grammy Awards.

Track listing
 Sean Paul Henriques co-wrote all of the songs on the album; additional writers are listed below.

Personnel
Adapted from the Imperial Blaze liner notes.

 Jimmy Douglass – mixing 
 Fabian Marasciullo – mixing 
 Gary Noble – mixing 
 Robert Orton – mixing 
 Demacio Castellon – mixing 
 Rohan Dyer – mixing 
 Bryan Powell – assistant mixing 
 Marlon James – art
 Gerard Needham – photography
 Ivy Jarrin – styling
 Denise Chen – make up
 Sara James – Blaze icon concept

Charts

References

External links
 AllSeanPaul.com – Sean Paul official website	
 Sean Paul on MySpace	
 Sean Paul interview by Pete Lewis, 'Blues & Soul' August 2009
 

Sean Paul albums
2009 albums
Atlantic Records albums
VP Records albums